Coppa's Fresh Market is a Canadian family-owned regional supermarket chain in the Greater Toronto Area. Charles and John Louis "Louie" Coppa originally founded the Highland Farms grocery store chain in 1963; however, the Coppa family split the company between the two brothers in 2013 with three former Highland Farms stores (the North York, Vaughan, and one of the Scarborough locations) being rebranded as Coppa's Fresh Market under a new company owned by Louie Coppa.

In 2015, it established the "Nonna Francesca" private label, named after the owner's grandmother. At launch, the label included fresh pasta, pasta sauces, pizza, and frozen entrees.

Locations 
The supermarket chain consists of three stores, one each in North York, Scarborough, and King City. A store it operated in Downtown Toronto called Market 63 was opened in February 2019 and shuttered in January 2022.

See also
List of supermarket chains in Canada

References

External links
 

2013 establishments in Ontario
Retail companies established in 2013
Supermarkets of Canada
Companies based in North York
Privately held companies of Canada
Canadian companies established in 2013
Family-owned companies of Canada